Studentenstadt is a Munich U-Bahn station in the borough of Schwabing-Freimann. It services the Studentenstadt that provides accommodation for university students.

References

External links

Munich U-Bahn stations
Railway stations in Germany opened in 1971
1971 establishments in West Germany